Markus Scharrer (born July 3, 1974) is an Austrian former professional footballer.

References

1974 births
Living people
Austrian footballers
Association football midfielders
FC Admira Wacker Mödling players
LASK players
SV Ried players
FC Tirol Innsbruck players
FC Red Bull Salzburg players
Kapfenberger SV players
People from Mödling
Footballers from Lower Austria